Eastshore is an unincorporated community in Marion County, Kansas, United States.  The community name comes from it being near the east shore of the Marion Reservoir.  As of the 2020 census, the population of the community and nearby areas was 92.  It is located north of the intersection of Pawnee Road and 210th Street.

History

Early history

For many millennia, the Great Plains of North America was inhabited by nomadic Native Americans.  From the 16th century to 18th century, the Kingdom of France claimed ownership of large parts of North America.  In 1762, after the French and Indian War, France secretly ceded New France to Spain, per the Treaty of Fontainebleau.

19th century
In 1802, Spain returned most of the land to France.  In 1803, most of the land for modern day Kansas was acquired by the United States from France as part of the 828,000 square mile Louisiana Purchase for 2.83 cents per acre.

In 1806, Zebulon Pike led the Pike Expedition westward from St Louis, Missouri, of which part of their journey followed the Cottonwood River through Marion County near the current cities of Florence, Marion, Durham, and the community of Eastshore.

In 1854, the Kansas Territory was organized, then in 1861 Kansas became the 34th U.S. state.  In 1855, Marion County was established within the Kansas Territory, which included the land for modern day Eastshore.

20th century
From 1964 to 1968, the Marion Reservoir was constructed.  Eastshore was platted on October 13, 1969.

Geography
Eastshore is located at coordinates 38.3819584, -97.0739122 in the scenic Flint Hills and Great Plains of the state of Kansas.  It lies immediately east of the Marion Cove of the Marion Reservoir.

Climate
The climate in this area is characterized by hot, humid summers and generally mild to cool winters.  According to the Köppen Climate Classification system, Eastshore has a humid subtropical climate, abbreviated "Cfa" on climate maps.

Demographics

For statistical purposes, the United States Census Bureau has defined Eastshore as a census-designated place (CDP).

Area attractions
 Marion Reservoir, immediately west of Eastshore.  The Marion cove is immediately west of Eastshore.  The Cottonwood Point cove is about 0.5 miles northwest of Eastshore.  The Dam is 0.1 miles southwest of Eastshore.  There are additional coves on the west side of the Reservoir.

Education
The community is served by Marion–Florence USD 408 public school district.  All students attend schools in Marion.  The high school is a member of T.E.E.N., a shared video teaching network between five area high schools.
 Marion High School, located in Marion.
 Marion Middle School, located in Marion.
 Marion Elementary School, located in Marion.

Media

Print
 Marion County Record, newspaper from Marion.
 Hillsboro Free Press, free newspaper for greater Marion County area.

Infrastructure

Transportation

Utilities
 Internet
 Wireless is provided by Pixius Communications.
 Satellite is provided by HughesNet, StarBand, WildBlue.
 TV
 Satellite is provided by DirecTV, Dish Network.
 Terrestrial is provided by regional digital TV stations.
 Electricity
 Community and Rural areas provided by Flint Hills RECA.
 Water
 Community and Rural areas provided by Marion County RWD #2.

References

Further reading

External links
 Topo Map of Eastshore and Pilsen area, USGS
 Marion County maps: Current, Historic, KDOT

Unincorporated communities in Kansas
Unincorporated communities in Marion County, Kansas
Populated places established in 1969